Jon Ajdini, also known professionally as Yon Idy, is a Macedonian-Albanian singer, and songwriter. He rose to prominence upon his debut single "Gentle", which reached number 12 in Albania. His success spawned four subsequent singles that attained chart success in the Albanian Top 100. Ajdini was shortlisted to compete at the Macedonian national selection, to select the nation's representative for the Eurovision Song Contest 2022.

Life and career

2019–present: Formations and continued success 

Yon Idy was born as Jon Ajdini into an Albanian family in the city of Skopje, North Macedonia. Featuring hip-hop, pop-rock and soul music, Ajdinis's debut single "Gentle" released in June 2019 peaked at number 12 in Albania. That year, "Walking the Line of Love" reached number 58 on the Albanian Top 100. His chart success followed into May 2020 with "Waste No Love", and his next single, "Back Around", peaked at number 35 in Albania. Another charting single, "Got Me All Down", was released in late 2020.

Artistry 

Ajdini is primarily characterised as a indie pop and pop rock artist fusioning various music genres, including hip-hop and soul music. For his indie pop-described single "My Fire", the singer drew influence from Leonard Cohen, Muse and The Beatles.

Discography

Singles

As lead artist

References 

Living people
Musicians from Skopje
Albanians in North Macedonia
Albanian musicians from North Macedonia
21st-century Albanian male singers
21st-century Macedonian male singers
Albanian songwriters
Macedonian songwriters
Year of birth unknown
Year of birth missing (living people)